Babura is a large village in Barhara block of Bhojpur district in Bihar, India. As of 2011, its population was 28,412, in 4,291 households. That year, it was the most populous village in Bhojpur district.

References 

Villages in Bhojpur district, India